Saddam Hussain (born 10 April 1993) is a Pakistani footballer who plays for Sui Southern Gas Company in the Pakistan Premier League, previously playing for Kyrgyz club FC Dordoi Bishkek & Khan Research Laboratories, as a central midfielder.

Hussain began his career at Pakistan International Airlines, one of the main teams' of his home province Sindh. Hussain played an important role, taking PIA to third place in the season of 2010. He moved to Khan Research Laboratories for the season of 2012. He won the Pakistan Premier League and the Challenge Cup in his first season at the club.

The following season, he won the league title of 2013. He moved to Dordoi Bishkek in the mid of the season of 2014, signing a two year contract with the club. After the first season at the club, he won the following honours: which included the league title, league cup and super cup.

He made his international debut for Pakistan in March 2011, in a 2–1 defeat against Palestine.

Career

Club
In August 2014, Hussain signed a two year contract with Dordoi Bishkek in the Kyrgyzstan League. The debut of Hussain for Dordoi was held on 28 August in a friendly match against Ala Too. Saddam helped the team win a landslide victory 3:0.

International
Hussain made his debut for Pakistan against Bangladesh during the 2011 SAFF Championship.

Career statistics

International

International goals

Scores and results table list Pakistan's goal tally first.

Honours

Club
Pakistan International Airlines
 Pakistan Premier League: Third Place: 2010
 Challenge Cup: Runner Up: 2009

Khan Research Laboratories
 Pakistan Premier League: 2012, 2013
 Challenge Cup: 2012
 AFC President's Cup: Runner Up: 2013

Dordoi Bishkek
Shoro Top League: 2014
Kyrgyzstan Cup: 2014
Kyrgyzstan Super Cup: 2014
Ala-Too Cup: 2015

Country
Pakistan
Philippine Peace Cup: Third Place: 2013

Achievements
He was player of the match of the second friendly against India where he scored a goal as well (with match rating of 8.5) and player of the series against India in two match friendly football series in 2014 at Bangalore, India.

References

External links

 Pakistan national team profile

 Twitter Profile

1993 births
Living people
Footballers from Karachi
Pakistani footballers
Pakistani expatriate footballers
Khan Research Laboratories F.C. players
Pakistani expatriate sportspeople in Kyrgyzstan
Pakistani expatriate sportspeople in Northern Cyprus
Association football midfielders
Pakistan international footballers
Expatriate footballers in Kyrgyzstan
FC Dordoi Bishkek players
Footballers at the 2010 Asian Games
Footballers at the 2014 Asian Games
Footballers at the 2018 Asian Games
Asian Games competitors for Pakistan
SSGC F.C. players